Jaroslav Diviš (born 9 July 1986) is a Czech football midfielder who currently plays for FK Viktoria Žižkov.

Career
Diviš began his career at the Czech second division team FC Vítkovice, for whom he scored 10 goals. In July 2009 Diviš signed a two-year contract with the Czech premier league side Slovan Liberec. On season 2010/2011 he was loaned out to Senica in Slovak Corgoň Liga. In July 2011, he joined Slovak club FK Senica on a three-year contract.

References

External links 
 
 
 

1986 births
Living people
People from Hustopeče
Czech footballers
Czech expatriate footballers
FC Slovan Liberec players
MFK Vítkovice players
1. FC Slovácko players
FK Senica players
FK Jablonec players
FK Mladá Boleslav players
FK Viktoria Žižkov players
Czech National Football League players
Czech First League players
Slovak Super Liga players
Association football forwards
Expatriate footballers in Slovakia
Czech expatriate sportspeople in Slovakia
Sportspeople from the South Moravian Region